Post Office Savings Bank is a name used by postal savings systems in several countries, including:
 New Zealand, later renamed the PostBank
 United Kingdom, later renamed the National Savings and Investments
 Singapore, later renamed POSB Bank
 Kenya, also known as the Kenya Post Office Savings Bank
 Austra, also known as the Österreichische Postsparkasse
 Zimbabwe, later renamed the People's Own Savings Bank

Note that some of these institutions are no longer affiliated with a postal service, often as a result of privatization.